Quadrant Private Equity (also simply known as Quadrant) is an Australian private equity investment firm based in Sydney, Australia. The company was founded as Quadrant Capital in 1996 by Chris Hadley.

Quadrant hosts multiple investment funds which invest in businesses across a wide array of industries and sectors, specifically targeting management buyouts and growth capital transactions. The first three Quadrant funds delivered a collective 37% return between 1996 and 2006.

The firm owns or co-owns a number of well-known Australian companies including Journey Beyond, Barbeques Galore, Timezone and Darrell Lea

Quadrant is Australia's largest fitness centre operator through acquisitions of brands including Fitness First, Jetts Fitness and GoodLife Fitness. Quadrant has floated a number of its interests on the Australian Securities Exchange (ASX) including Kathmandu, Virtus Health, Isentia, APN Outdoor, Bapcor (previously Burson Auto Parts) and Estia Health.

Notable investments

Quadrant bought Kathmandu in 2006 for NZ$275 million, floating the company on the ASX three years later for around AU$350 million.

In 2007, Quadrant acquired Australian-owned fast food restaurants Red Rooster, Chicken Treat and Oporto in deals collectively worth A$240 million, forming Quick Service Restaurant Holdings (renamed in 2017 as Craveable Brands). The group of 620 stores was sold in 2011 to Archer Capital for A$450 million.

Quadrant purchased a half-stake in advertising company APN Outdoor in 2011, before acquiring the remaining stake from APN News & Media in 2013 for around A$70 million. It was listed on the ASX in 2014.

In 2012, Quadrant and Ironbridge Capital formed BBQSAM Holdings after acquiring retailers Barbeques Galore and Amart Furniture.

Quadrant purchased Zip Industries in 2013 from its founder, and after abandoning an IPO offloaded the company to Culligan in 2017 for around US$550 million.

In 2014, Quadrant purchased a 45% stake in Canberra Data Centres for A$140 million, selling the businesses two years later. The deal was recognised with an award from The Australian Private Equity and Venture Capital Association Limited (AVCAL).

In 2015, Quadrant purchased Queensland-based pet food company VIP Pet Foods for A$410 million. After renaming the company The Real Pet Food Company, Quadrant sold the business to a foreign consortium including Singapore's Temasek Holdings and Chinese firms Hosen Capital and New Hope Group for A$1 billion in 2017.

In 2016, Quadrant acquired restaurants owned by chef Neil Perry through its Urban Purveyor Group for a reported A$65 million, creating the Rockpool Dining Group. Quadrant acquired a majority stake in Great Southern Rail in 2016, operator of the Indian Pacific and The Ghan train journeys, folding the company into its investments in Cruise Whitsundays and Rottnest Express to form tourism company Experience Australia Group.

Also in 2016, Quadrant Private Equity formed Fitness and Lifestyle Group, after purchasing Jetts Fitness, Goodlife Health Clubs, Hypoxi and the Australian arm of Fitness First, becoming the largest operator of fitness centres in Australia. The holding company is partially-owned by Oaktree Capital Management. Queensland-based Go Health Clubs were added in 2017. The Australian arm of Jetts Fitness was divested in 2022, retaining the international Jetts brand.

In 2017, Quadrant acquired a partial stake in gaming arcade company Timezone.

In 2017, Quadrant sold their majority share of Icon Group, Australia's largest oncology provider, in a reported $1.1 billion deal.

Quadrant purchased an 80-90% stake in confectionary company Darrell Lea in 2018 in a deal worth around A$200 million.

In 2019, Quadrant bought auction business Grays Online for A$60 million from Eclipx Group.

In 2020, Quadrant bought the Enterprise business from Arq Group as part of a consortium for A$35 million. 

Quadrant acquired Jaybro, a supplier to the construction and infrastructure sector operating in Australia and New Zealand, in March 2022.

Funds

Quadrant Private Equity has operated a total of 9 individual funds.

References

External links
 

Private equity firms of Australia
Investment companies of Australia
Privately held companies of Australia
Holding companies of Australia
Financial services companies established in 1996
Financial services companies based in Sydney
Australian companies established in 1996
Holding companies established in 1996